High Tech High may refer to:
 High Tech High charter schools, California-based school-development organization
 High Technology High School, a school located in Lincroft, New Jersey 
 Gary and Jerri-Ann Jacobs High Tech High Charter School, a school located in San Diego, California
 High Tech High School, a school in Secaucus, New Jersey